Numerous plants have been introduced to Utah, and many of them have become invasive species. The following are some of these species:

See also
Invasive species in the United States
sus

External links
USDA PLANTS Database USDA database showing county distribution of plant species in the US
InvasiveSpecies.gov Information from the US National Invasive Species Council

Environment of Utah
Natural history of Utah
Utah
Invasive plant